List of compositions by Jennifer Higdon. All works are in alphabetical order.

Opera
Cold Mountain: (premiered The Santa Fe Opera, 1 August 2015)
Woman With Eyes Closed: (premiered Opera Philadelphia, September 2021)

Chamber

Flute
Amazing Grace
Autumn Reflection
DASH
The Jeffrey Mode
Legacy
Lullaby
Mountain Songs
Music Box of Light
rapid.fire (for solo flute)
running the edgE
Song (for solo flute)
Steeley Pause
Trio Song
Wedding Hymn

Mixed Instrumentation

Autumn Music
Ceremonies
Ceremonies Suite
Dark Wood
Dash
Music Box of Light
Piano Trio
Quiet Art
Scenes from the Poet's Dreams
Smash
Soliloquy
Sonata for Viola and Piano
String Poetic
String Trio
Summer Shimmers
Trio Songs
Trumpet Songs
wissahickon poeTrees
Zaka
Zango Bandango

Clarinet and ensemble

Celestial Hymns
DASH
Light Refracted
Soliloquy

String quartets

Amazing Grace
An Exaltation of Larks
Impressions
Sky Quartet
Southern Harmony
Voices

Saxophone

Bop
Lullaby
Sax Sonata
Short Stories

Percussion

Like Clockwork
Splendid Wood
ZONES

Piano and piano ensemble

Bentley Roses
Piano Trio (2003)
Piano Trio Color Through (2016)
Scenes from the Poet's Dreams
Secret & Glass Gardens (for solo piano)
Summer Shimmers

Choral

Deep in the Night (1997)
O magnum mysterium (2002)
On the Death of the Righteous (2009)
A Quiet Moment (1999)
Sanctus (2001)
Sing, Sing (1999)
The Singing Rooms (2007)
somewhere i have never travelled, gladly beyond (2006)
Southern Grace (1998)
The Singing Art (2004)
Voice of the Bard (2005)

Vocal

Bentley Roses
breaking
Dooryard Bloom
Falling
Hop and Toe Dance
In Our Quiet
Lullaby
Morning Opens
Notes on Love
Red
Threaded
To Home
Wedding Hymn

Orchestral

All Things Majestic (2011)
blue cathedral (1999)
Celebration Fanfare (2003)
City Scape (2002)
Concerto 4-3 (2007)
Concerto for Orchestra (2002)
Dance Card (2015)
Dooryard Bloom (2004)
Duo Duel (Double Percussion Concerto) (2022)
Fanfare Ritmico (1999)
Harp Concerto (2018)
Light (2006)
The Light That We Can Hear (Flute Concerto) (2022)
Loco (2004)
Low Brass Concerto (2017)
Machine (2003)
Mandolin Concerto (2021)
Oboe Concerto (2005)
On a Wire (2010)
On the Death of the Righteous (2009)
Percussion Concerto (2005)
Piano Concerto (2006)
Shine (1995)
The Singing Rooms (2007)
Soliloquy (1989)
Soprano Sax Concerto (2007)
Spirit (2006)
To the Point (2004)
Trombone Concerto (2005)
Tuba Concerto (2017)
Viola Concerto (2015)
Violin Concerto (2008) - recipient of a 2010 Pulitzer Prize, written for and played by Hilary Hahn
Wind Shear (2000)

String orchestra

Celebration Fanfare
"String" from Concerto for Orchestra
To The Point

Wind ensemble and band

Fanfare Ritmico (2002)
Kelly's Field (2006)
Oboe Concerto—arranged for solo oboe and wind ensemble (2008)
Percussion Concerto—arranged for solo percussion and wind ensemble (2009)
Rhythm Stand (2004)
Road Stories (2010)
Soprano Sax Concerto—arranged for solo soprano sax and wind ensemble (2009)

References
Jennifer Higdon's Website

Higdon, Jennifer